George Bussey (born October 24, 1984) is a former American football offensive guard. He was drafted by the New England Patriots in the fifth round of the 2009 NFL Draft. He played college football at Louisville.

Early years
Bussey attended Western High School in Louisville, Kentucky, where he played football as an offensive lineman. He was named a county all-star and started at both tackle and guard.

College career
After graduating from high school in 2004, Bussey was a walk-on at the University of Louisville. He was a reserve offensive lineman and played on special teams in his sophomore season in 2005. In 2006, he started all 13 games playing both tackle and guard, and did not yield a sack en route to a first-team All-Big East Conference selection. He started 12 games in his junior season and earned Second-team All-Big East honors. In his 2008 senior season, Bussey was named a first-team All-Big East for the second time, playing both guard and tackle, and was named to Outland Trophy preseason watch lists.

Professional career

New England Patriots
Bussey was drafted by the Patriots in the fifth round (170th overall) of the 2009 NFL Draft. On July 23, he signed a four-year contract. He was placed on injured reserve on September 5 with a knee injury, ending his season. He returned to participate in the Patriots' preseason games in 2010 before being waived/injured on September 4. He cleared waivers the next day and was placed on injured reserve. Bussey received an injury settlement and became a free agent on September 13, 2010.

San Jose SaberCats
On July 17, 2015, Bussey was placed on reassignment.

References

External links
New England Patriots bio
Louisville Cardinals bio

1984 births
Living people
Players of American football from Louisville, Kentucky
American football offensive tackles
American football offensive guards
Louisville Cardinals football players
New England Patriots players
Tampa Bay Storm players
Jacksonville Jaguars players
San Jose SaberCats players
Western High School (Louisville, Kentucky) alumni